YMCA is a worldwide youth and community organization.

YMCA may also refer to:

Art and entertainment
 "Y.M.C.A." (song), a 1978 song by the Village People
YMCA Baseball Team, a semi-historical 2002 South Korean comedy film

Buildings
 List of YMCA buildings

Education
Other colleges and universities founded by YMCA but not including "YMCA" in their name can be found in :Category:Universities and colleges founded by the YMCA.
YMCA College (disambiguation), a number of colleges and universities founded by or associated with YMCA
YMCA College of Physical Education, first college for physical education of Asia, was established in 1920 and affiliated to the Tamil Nadu physical education and sports university
Central YMCA College, a college operated by YMCA in Chicago, Illinois, United States
International YMCA College was the name of Springfield College in Massachusetts from 1912 to 1954.
YMCA of Hong Kong Christian College
YMCA University of Science and Technology, a state university located in Faridabad, in the state of Haryana, India
Osaka YMCA International High School, Japan

Media
YMCA Press, a publishing house established by YMCA, and originally known as Editeurs Réunis

Organizations or institutions
YMCA Youth Parliament
YMCA NSW Youth Parliament

Sports
Association football
Dumfries YMCA F.C., a football club from the town of Dumfries in Scotland
Horsham YMCA F.C., a football club based in Horsham, West Sussex, England
Mount Merrion YMCA F.C., a football club based in Mount Merrion, Dublin, Ireland.
YMCA FC (East Timor), a football club of East Timor based in Dili
YMCA F.C. (Belfast), a former Irish football club based in Belfast, formed by the members of Belfast YMCA
YMCA F.C. (Dublin), an Irish football club based in Sandymount, Dublin

Other sports
YMCA Cricket Club, a cricket club in Dublin, Ireland
YMCA Hockey Club, a field hockey club based in YMCA Sports Grounds, Claremont Road, Sandymount, Dublin

See also 
The Y (disambiguation)
YWCA (disambiguation)